This is a list of notable footballers who have played for Doncaster Rovers. The aim is for this list to include all players that have played 100 or more senior matches for the club. Other players who are deemed to have played an important role for the club can be included, but the reason for their notability should be included in the 'Notes' column.

For a list of all Doncaster Rovers players with a Wikipedia article, see :Category:Doncaster Rovers F.C. players, and for the current squad see Doncaster Rovers F.C.#Current squad.

Explanation of List

Players should be listed in chronological order according to the year in which they first played for the club, and then by alphabetical order of their surname. Appearances and goals should include substitute appearances, but exclude wartime matches. Further information on competitions/seasons which are regarded as eligible for appearance stats are provided below, and if any data is not available for any of these competitions an appropriate note should be added to the table.

League appearances
League appearances and goals should include data for the following league spells, but should not include play-off matches:
 Midland Alliance: 1890−91
 Midland Football League: 1891-92 to 1900-01; 1903–04; 1905-06 to 1922-23
 The Yorkshire League: 1897−98 to 1898−99
 Football League: 1901-02 to 1902-03; 1904–05; 1923-24 to 1997-98; 2003-04 to present
 Football Conference: 1998-99 to 2002-03

Total appearances
The figures for total appearances and goals should include the League figures together with the following competitions:
 Play-off matches (2002–03 and 2007–08)
 FA Cup; FA Trophy (1998-99 to 2002-03)
 Football League Cup, Football League Trophy (including three seasons as a Conference club 2000-01 to 2002-03), Football League Group Cup (1982–83), Football League Third Division North Cup (1933-34 to 1934-35; 1937–38)
 Conference League Cup (1999-00 to 2000-01)
 Sheffield and Hallamshire FA Minor Challenge Cup
 Sheffield and Hallamshire FA Senior Challenge Cup
 Gainsborough News Charity Cup
 Wharncliffe Charity Cup
 Mexborough Montague Charity Cup
 Friendlies (pre 1890−91 when Doncaster weren't in a league)

NOT included:
 Wartime League matches
 Friendlies (1890−91 onwards)

List of players
Statistics are up to date as of 18:24 5 April 2021 (UTC).

Charle Chester 
1892-99

Football League 100 Legends
The following Doncaster players have been included in the Football League 100 Legends.

PFA Team of the Year
The following have been included in the PFA Team of the Year whilst playing for Doncaster.

Footnotes

References 
 
 
 Soccerbase stats (use Search for...on left menu and select 'Players' drop down)
 During Doncaster's period in the Conference the database does not include full match stats:
FA Cup Qualifying Round matches do not have line-ups included in the database. This affects a total of 7 matches during the period.
Only one of their FA Trophy games has match line-ups in Soccerbase, namely the original game against Yeovil on 19 February 2002, leaving a total of 9 Trophy matches without line-ups.
 A to Z Doncaster player stats at doncasterrovers.co.uk - Other than league matches appearance data only appears to include FA Cup and Football League Cup matches (the latter do not seem to be present for seasons 1993-94 to 1997-98). Play-off statistics are included, but are listed within the 'League' totals.
 Surnames A to C
 Surnames D to F
 Surnames G to J
 Surnames K to M
 Surnames N to R
 Surnames S to T
 Surnames U to W
 List of managers with date of first/last game in charge at doncasterrovers.co.uk
 
 Appearances, goals and club years stats at since1888.co.uk Michael Joyce (site no longer active)

 
Doncaster Rovers
Association football player non-biographical articles